Mockridge is a surname. Notable people with this surname include:

Bill Mockridge (born 1947), Canadian-German actor
Cyril J. Mockridge (1896–1979), English-American film and television composer
Frank Mockridge (1903–1990), Australian rules footballer
 (born 1993), German actor
Luke Mockridge (born 1989), German comedian and author
 (born 1986), German entrepreneur and singer
Russell Mockridge (1928–1958), Australian racing cyclist
Tom Mockridge (born 1955), New Zealand businessman, current CEO of Virgin Media

de:Mockridge